The Dranesville Tavern that was located in Dranesville, Virginia dates from 1850.  It was listed on the National Register of Historic Places in 1972.  The building has been moved from its original location and is now located near Herndon.

It was a "wagon stand" type of tavern, catering to teamsters.

The proposed widening of Route 7 in the mid-1960s threatened the Dranesville Tavern. In 1968, the building was moved 130 feet from its original location to preserve it.

References

External links

Old Tavern, 11919 Leesburg Pike (moved from orig. location), Herndon, Fairfax County, VA: 1 photo and 8 measured drawings at Historic American Buildings Survey

Drinking establishments on the National Register of Historic Places in Virginia
National Register of Historic Places in Fairfax County, Virginia
Greek Revival architecture in Virginia
Commercial buildings completed in 1850
Historic American Buildings Survey in Virginia